In the United States, Corridor D is part of the Appalachian Development Highway System. In Ohio, it follows State Route 32 from the eastern Cincinnati suburbs until a point west of Albany, where it becomes concurrent with U.S. Route 50. After crossing into West Virginia, it follows U.S. Route 50 until the Interstate 79 interchange in Clarksburg.

The West Virginia portion was constructed during 1967–1977, and the Ohio portion during 2000–2008. ADHS Funding is separate from other Federal Highway funds.

Route description

Ohio 

Corridor D begins at the western edge of the Appalachian Regional Commission area at the Hamilton County–Clermont County border east of Cincinnati. It intersects Interstate 275, Cincinnati's beltway, and then U.S. Route 68 and U.S. Route 62 as it crosses the Ohio glacial till plain.

Corridor D enters the Allegheny Plateau east of Peebles, crossing the Portage Escarpment near the summit of Tener Mountain before descending into the Scioto River valley and intersecting U.S. Route 23 (Corridor C). After about  it passes through Jackson, where it is intersected by U.S. Route 35. After another  it converges with U.S. Route 50; the two routes are concurrent for the remainder of the segment through Ohio.

The highway crosses the Ohio River on the Blennerhassett Island Bridge just west of Belpre.

West Virginia 

Corridor D crosses the Little Kanawha River and interchanges with Interstate 77 near Parkersburg shortly after entering West Virginia. It continues to ascend the Allegheny Plateau through rugged terrain. In Clarksburg, it crosses the West Fork River and ends at the Interstate 79 interchange, with U.S. Route 50 continuing eastward as a two-lane mountain road.

History 

One of the original 23 corridors, Corridor D (U.S. Highway 50) was to provide access to major urban centers along the east coast from the midwest, while creating economic development for northwest and North-Central West Virginia and southeast Ohio.

The Blennerhassett Island Bridge, a tied-arch bridge, opened to traffic on June 13, 2008, over the Ohio River thus completing Corridor D in its entirety.

West Virginia 
The earliest segment of Corridor D, or US 50, to open in West Virginia was a six-mile (10 km) segment in 1967  from an isolated point near Sherwood in Doddridge County (MP 15) to WV 23 in Salem in Harrison County (MP 1.52). Two years later, a segment from Salem east to CR 11 at Wolf Summit (MP 7) opened to traffic.

In 1970, major portions of Corridor D opened to traffic:
 A brief segment in Wood County from MP 8 to MP 11 near Murphytown.
 A segment of US 50 in Ritchie County at WV 74 at Pennsboro (MP 17) east to Doddridge County at West Union (MP 5.5).

Most of Corridor D opened a year later.
 A segment four-lane upgrade of US 50 opened in Wood County from Interstate 77 east of Parkersburg (MP 4) to MP 8 near Murphytown.
 A segment within Wood County from MP 11 near Murphytown to Sandhill (MP 15.41). This connected the disjointed segments between #1 and #2 listed above.
 The majority of Ritchie County's US 50 segment opened from MP 4 near North Bend State Park to WV 74 at Pennsboro (MP 17). This connected the disjointed segments between #2 and #3 listed above.
 A segment in Doddridge County from MP 5.52 near West Union east to WV 23 near Salem (MP 15).

In 1974, a segment of Corridor D in Harrison County opened to traffic from CR 11 at Wolf Summit (MP 7) to the CR 11 at Wilsonburg (MP 11). In 1977, this was extended eastward to WV 20 at Montpelier east of Clarksburg (MP 15.5), and a year later, to Interstate 79 west of Bridgeport (MP 18.25).

Completion into Ohio 
Construction began in 2000 with the start of the Godbey Fields complex in Parkersburg, West Virginia. The $6.5 million  athletic complex was finished in 2001. Several contracts were let soon after, which included grading and drainage for part of Corridor D, a new Corning Glass Bridge for WV 47, and another span that would carry US 50 over WV 47 and 7th Street in Parkersburg.

On September 8, 2003, the first segment of Corridor D opened. The  four-lane controlled-access highway stretched from Interstate 77 to WV 47 in Parkersburg.

On September 20, 2004, the second portion of Corridor D opened from WV 47 to WV 14, which included the construction of a Little Kanawha River crossing. With this segment open to traffic, 1/3 of the Parkersburg Corridor D segment was complete.

On March 9, 2005, a tied arch Ohio River crossing design was chosen from four designs as it was the "most economical and least intrusive on the environment of Blennerhassett Island. It is being constructed from weathering steel and will connect WV 892 to OH 618. At the time of its contract letting in April 2005, it was the largest single highway contract in West Virginia's history. The bridge is expected to be complete in 2007.

On July 12, 2005, it was announced that the final Corridor D contract in West Virginia was to be awarded. In Ohio, a single contract was announced that would connect the Ohio River span to U.S. Route 50 which would be completed in 2007.

In August 2005, Corridor D was opened to traffic from WV 14 to WV 68.

In mid-September 2005, Corridor D was completed from Fifth Street in Parkersburg to WV 892, WV 95, and WV 68. This segment was constructed under five contracts and required the completion of ten bridges.

As of April 23, 2006, construction on the Corridor D mainlines from Interstate 77 to WV 892 is all but complete. The last segment, from WV 892 to the WV 892, WV 95, and WV 68 interchange, was slated to open in August.

On August 31, 2006, it was announced that from WV 892/WV 68 to the WV 892 interchange, Corridor D was open to traffic. This  four-lane divided freeway is the final roadway section of the corridor from Clarksburg and Cincinnati without the Ohio River crossing.

The last Corridor D project, the Blennerhasset Bridge crossing the Ohio River, was opened on June 13, 2008.

There are long-range plans to expand the diamond interchange at Interstate 77 into a fully directional interchange at a cost of $60 million. It is ranked 75th.

Notes 
 The official sign for Corridor D in West Virginia, while not utilized on full-sized shields, is a blue background shield with a West Virginia state outline in white with a blue letter in the center.
 In late 2006, there were recent additions of mile markers every 1/2 mile along Corridor D between Parkersburg and Clarksburg. These mile markers feature the official sign for Corridor D as described above.

See also 
Northwestern Turnpike

References

External links 
Appalachian Development Highway System
West Virginia Corridor D Homepage

D
Northwestern Turnpike
Roads in Ohio
Roads in Cincinnati
Roads in West Virginia
U.S. Route 50